Shesh Bahreh-ye Olya (also Romanized as Shesh Bahreh-ye ‘Olyā and Shesh Bahreh ‘Olyā; also known as Shesh Bahreh Bālā and Shesh Bahreh-ye Bālā) is a village in Milas Rural District, in the Central District of Lordegan County, Chaharmahal and Bakhtiari Province, Iran. At the 2006 census, its population was 1,077, in 184 families.

References 

Populated places in Lordegan County